Hart Miller Island is located at the mouths of Back River and Middle River, where they empty into the Chesapeake Bay east of the City of Baltimore in Maryland.  It was formerly two separate islands, Hart Island and Miller Island, but it is now almost entirely artificial. In 1981, the area began being filled with dredged material by the U.S. Army Corps of Engineers, for the purpose of habitat restoration, and the project is scheduled for completion in 2012.  It is now in use as Hart-Miller Island State Park, accessible only by boat.

References

External links
 Maryland Department of Natural Resources website on Hart-Miller Island
 Creating a Unique Resource out of Dredged Material by Arnold "Butch" Norden, Maryland Department of Natural Resources, 2004

Landforms of Baltimore County, Maryland
Uninhabited islands of Maryland
River islands of Maryland
Maryland islands of the Chesapeake Bay